Erlend Svardal Bøe (born 30 December 1992) is a Norwegian politician.

He was elected representative to the Storting from the constituency of Troms for the period 2021–2025, for the Conservative Party.

References

1992 births
Living people
Conservative Party (Norway) politicians
Troms politicians
Members of the Storting